Kim-Jho Gwang-soo (born 26 March 1965), also known as Peter Kim, is a South Korean film director, screenwriter, film producer and LGBT rights activist.

Career
Kim Gwang-soo was born in Seongbuk District, Seoul. He disclosed his sexual orientation in 2006, and legally changed his name to Kim Jho Gwang-soo. Kim-Jho is one of South Korea's few openly gay film directors and has been involved in the production of several works with LGBT themes.

He collaborated with director Leesong Hee-il to produce the 2006 film No Regret, considered to be "the first real Korean gay feature." In 2008, he directed and wrote his first short film, Boy Meets Boy as well as two follow-ups: Just Friends? (2009) and LOVE, 100°C (2010). His first feature film, Two Weddings and a Funeral was released in 2012.

Personal life
Kim Jho held a public, non-legal wedding ceremony with film distributor David Kim Seung-hwan (his partner since 2004), in Seoul on September 7, 2013, the first of its kind in the country which does not recognize same-sex marriages. The preparations for their wedding and the ceremony itself was the subject of Jang Hee-sun's 2015 documentary My Fair Wedding.

Filmography

Director
 2008 Boy Meets Boy
 2009 Just Friends?
 2010 Ghost (Be With Me)
 2010 LOVE, 100°C
 2012 Two Weddings and a Funeral
 2014 One Night Only

Writer
 2008 Boy Meets Boy
 2009 Just Friends?
 2010 LOVE, 100°C
 2014 One Night Only

Producer
 2001 Wanee & Junah
 2002 Jealousy Is My Middle Name
 2004 So Cute
 2005 The Red Shoes
 2006 No Regret
 2006 Old Miss Diary
 2007 Boys of Tomorrow
 2007 Pornmaking for Dummies
 2007 Milky Way Liberation Front
 2010 Ghost (Be With Me)
 2010 Break Away
 2011 Detective K: Secret of the Virtuous Widow
 2011 The Client
 2015 Detective K: Secret of the Lost Island
 2019 Jo Pil-ho: The Dawning Rage

See also
List of Korean film directors
Cinema of Korea
Contemporary culture of South Korea

References

External links

1965 births
Living people
South Korean film directors
South Korean LGBT screenwriters
South Korean LGBT rights activists
LGBT rights in South Korea
Gay screenwriters
LGBT film directors
South Korean human rights activists
South Korean humanitarians
South Korean gay writers
South Korean columnists
Gwangsan Kim clan